The Ultramagnetic MCs is an American hip hop group based in The Bronx, New York City. Founded by Kool Keith, the group also includes Ced Gee, TR Love, and Moe Love. Tim Dog became an unofficial member in 1989. In 1990, DJ Jaycee was added as a road manager and backup DJ. Big.D was put down with the crew by Kool Keith in 1989. A former member, Rooney Roon, was fired following an assault arrest. Beat-boxer Rahzel was also involved with the group early in its career. The group's work was associated with unorthodox sampling, polysyllabic rhymes, and bizarre lyrical imagery.

History 
The Ultramagnetic MCs formed in 1984. Their first single was "To Give You Love" (1985) on the Diamond International label. The group released "Ego Trippin'", its first 12-inch single on Next Plateau Records in 1986. It was the first hip hop song to feature the "Synthetic Substitution" drum break sample, composed by Melvin Bliss and one of the most sampled songs of all time. The group's next single was "Travelling at the Speed of Thought (Original)"/"M.C.'s Ultra (Part Two)" followed by "Funky"/"Mentally Mad," one of their most sought-after 12-inch singles. "Travelling" used extensive sampling from "Louie Louie" by the Kingsmen while "Funky" was based on a Joe Cocker piano sample later used as the basis for 2Pac's "California Love". The single was released in 1987, and led to the release of the group's first album.

The Ultramagnetic MCs released a new school classic in 1988, Critical Beatdown, introducing many new sampling techniques. Many believe that without the group's primary producer, Ced Gee, the golden era of sampling may have looked very different. Ced, while uncredited, also produced the majority of Boogie Down Productions' seminal Criminal Minded. These albums are among the first to use "chopped" samples, rearranged and edited to change context. Both albums also feature many James Brown samples, which became prominent in hip hop in ensuing years. KRS-One has been quoted as saying that he was close to joining Ultramagnetic MCs early on. Paul C. was also a major contributor to Critical Beatdown, producing "Give The Drummer Some," and engineering most of the album. Paul C. also produced the Hip-House mix of "Traveling At The Speed Of Thought", which was used as the group's first music video, and was their sole release in 1989. The single's b-side, "A Chorus Line", became one of Ultramagnetic's most popular songs and introduced new group affiliate Tim Dog. A variation of the "A Chorus Line" instrumental was used as the basis of Tim Dog's debut single, the Ced Gee-produced "Fuck Compton", which became a modest hit and is credited with helping to spark the East coast/West coast feud of the mid 1990s.

The group went on a hiatus for several years, breaking up temporarily in 1990. They returned on Mercury Records in 1992, with the album Funk Your Head Up. The album received a muted response, in part because many tracks had been given a commercial sheen, having been remixed by outside producers at the label's insistence. Alternate mixes of this album's songs along with unreleased tracks from the sessions have appeared on later compilations. The song "Poppa Large", remixed by Da Beatminerz, became a hit and remains a staple of Kool Keith's live show. The song's video featured Keith in a straitjacket, his bald head encased in a birdcage.

In 1993, the group released the album The Four Horsemen, which featured guest production and vocals by Godfather Don, who produced solo Kool Keith sessions in 1992. Some of those tracks appear on The Four Horsemen, and also on Cenobites. The former was the last official album the Ultramagnetic MC's released until their 2007 reunion.

There were many semi-legitimate and compilation albums to follow, the most official of which was Next Plateau's The B-Sides Companion, which featured a new song, some unreleased 1989 songs recorded for a second Next Plateau LP and most of the group's classic singles, albeit in newly remixed form. Ced Gee and Moe Love both provided demos and unreleased songs spanning the group's entire career to Tuff City for a series of four albums which were released without Kool Keith's consent. A live album, Brooklyn To Brixton, was announced but abandoned.

As a reaction to Ced and Moe's involvement in the Tuff City releases, Kool Keith and Tim Dog reunited on the album Big Time, released under the name Ultra in 1997. Kool Keith went on to record many solo CDs, including several under aliases such as Dr. Octagon and Dr. Dooom. His abstract rhymes and syncopated, off-beat delivery influenced many rappers, including Pharoahe Monch from Organized Konfusion and Ghostface Killah of Wu-Tang Clan.

In 2001, Ultramagnetic MCs released a single, "Make It Rain" / "Mix It Down". Two other songs, "Baby, I'm Mad" and "Who Am I?" were recorded at the same sessions, but remain officially unreleased. In 2004, the original versions of the Next Plateau singles were finally released on CD as bonus tracks on the remastered Critical Beatdown. In a 9 December 2005 interview on Houston's Late Nite Snax radio show, Kool Keith confirmed rumours that the Ultramagnetic MC's had reformed and recorded a new album. Founding Ultramagnetic MC's member Ced Gee has set up Factshen Records. A new Ultramagnetic MC's LP, Back to the Future—The Bronx Kings Are Back, was scheduled to be released in 2006 but was later named The Best Kept Secret and released in January 2007. Although the album's cover features the original line-up of Kool Keith, Ced Gee, Moe Love and TR Love, TR (along with Tim Dog) were absent. Instead, guest verses are provided by newcomers like Grafiq Malachi Sebek. However, Tim Dog and TR Love have each recently released songs featuring Ultramagnetic under their own names. The group also released a new song after the album's release called "We About Chix", the video can be seen on YouTube.

The group performed live at the ATP I'll Be Your Mirror festival curated by ATP & Portishead in September 2011 in Asbury Park, New Jersey.

Discography

Studio albums

Collaborations
 2019 – The Foundation

Compilation albums

Singles

As lead artist

1984 – "To Give You Love"/"Make You Shake"
1986 – "Ego Trippin'"/"Ego Bits"/"Funky Potion"
1987 – "Traveling At The Speed of Thought (Original)"/"M.C.'s Ultra (Part Two)"
1987 – "Mentally Mad"/"Funky"
1988 – "Watch Me Now"/"Feelin' It"
1988 – "Ease Back"/"Kool Keith Housing Things"
1989 – "Give The Drummer Some"/"Moe Luv Theme"
1989 – "Traveling At The Speed Of Thought (Remixes/LP Version)"/"A Chorus Line" (featuring Tim Dog)
1991 – "Make It Happen"/"A Chorus Line (Pt. II)"
1992 – "Poppa Large (East Coast Remix)/(West Coast Remix)"
1993 – "Two Brothers With Checks (San Francisco Harvey)"/"One Two, One Two"
1993 – "Raise It Up (featuring Godfather Don)"/"The Saga Of Dandy, The Devil And Day (Black Baseball)"
1994 – "I'm Fuckin' Flippin"
1997 – "Watch Your Back"
2001 – "Make It Rain"/"Mix It Down"
2006 – "Mechanism Nice (Born Twice)"/"Nottz"

Appearances
1987 – "Red Alert Goes Berzerk"
1994 – "Wild Pitch Classics"
1999 – "It's All The Way Live" appears on a compilation, called Connected

Notes

References

External links
Koolkeith.co.uk
Ultrakeith.net
Tuffcity.com
Rolling Stone page

African-American musical groups
Five percenters
Hip hop collectives
Hip hop groups from New York City
Mercury Records artists
Next Plateau Entertainment artists
Wild Pitch Records artists
Rappers from the Bronx
Musical groups from the Bronx